Argentine University of Enterprise  (UADE) is a private university in Buenos Aires, Argentina. It was founded by the Argentine Chamber of Corporations.

UADE is an institution which is conceived, born and developed from a global management perspective. It was created with the aim of training professionals who adapt to the growing needs of each industry. The growth was possible thanks to the determination of young people with an entrepreneurial vocation as well as the solidarity support of companies and institutions in the country, thus renewing the solid prestige earned by our university.

It has campuses in Buenos Aires and Pinamar. The Buenos Aires campus features  of classrooms, laboratories, library, sports centre, theatre, food court and a residence hall. As of 2020, it had 33,000 undergraduate and postgraduate students and 1,877 professors.

It is recognized for providing a uniquely elite education and it is clearly defined in contrast to the supposed shortcomings of the public university.

History

UADE was founded in 1957 by members of the Cámara Argentina de Sociedades Anónimas as the Instituto Superior de Estudios de la Empresa. Its activities began in the building of Belgrano Av. 687 under the direction of Dr. Jacob Wainer, and with a total of 338 business executives enrolled.   The first class was delivered by Dr. Anwar Obeid who spoke about "The corporation: its importance and influence in the development of the modern world." At the end of that year, to arrange education and higher education in a comprehensive manner, the Institute became the Argentina Foundation for Advanced Business Studies. It aimed to promote training in all disciplines related to the development of social enterprise as an economic institution, considering the specific problems of the real business in Argentina.Around 500 business leaders completed the course in 1958 and the following year, in a large ceremony held at the Plaza Hotel in Buenos Aires, the course for 1959 was opened. At the event, the Minister of Economy, Dr. William W. Klein, the Secretary of State for Trade, Dr. Joseph C. Orfila, and the Minister of Education and Justice, Dr. Luis Mac Kay (who spoke on behalf of the President of the Republic, Dr. Arturo Frondizi) delivered their speeches. The growth process was consolidated in 1962 when, in the context of the Law 14,557 of 1958 authorizing the operation of private universities in the country, the Chamber of Corporations decided to create the UNIVERSIDAD ARGENTINA DE LA EMPRESA, whose statutes were approved by that institution on June 7, 1963, and the National Executive Power on August 27 of that year.

In 1963, the first degrees were offered in areas of special interest for business: "Marketing," "Costs", "Finance and Organisation", "Organisation of Production" and "Industrial Relations" . In  1964 other degrees were added, such as "Business Applied Statistics", "Market Research", "Public Relations", "Management Techniques" and "Production Engineering and Construction Organization."

In 1968, the Universidad Argentina de la Empresa joined the Council of Rectors of Private Universities (CRUP), after Law 17,604 passed in that year, institutionalizing the agency's performance in the education activities of Argentina, recognizing it as a representative body in the planning and action of the private sector, and acting as an adviser for the National Executive Power.

In 1984, the headquarters at Lima St. 717 were inaugurated and, subsequently, in 1992, 1993, 1997, and 1998 new buildings were added to create the current building complex on Lima St., functionally integrated, bringing all the faculties and departments of the university together. In 2000 the Faculty and Alumni Club was added in an annex building on Chile St., thus extending the facilities that make the UADE urban campus the most modern in Argentina. In 2003, the School of Management (EDDE) was opened on Freedom St. 1340, with the purpose of developing a new business generation in the country. Finally, in 2005, the UADE University Residence was opened, which is capable of accommodating 105 local and foreign students.

In 2008, the Urban Campus UADE was opened with the objective of helping students have a comprehensive and complete college experience.

In 2009, UADE and CONICET, the main body for the promotion of science and technology in Argentina, signed an Agreement on Scientific and Technological Cooperation which will develop an extensive interaction between the two institutions. In this regard, co-financing will be sought with the CONICET doctoral fellowships as well as the possibility that researchers from this body can develop their work of study in UADE.

Finally, the UADE Labs were set up in May 2010. This is a building of 9000 m2 which is presented to national and regional level as the first integrated university laboratory building in the country. In it, students in 51 undergraduate and graduate programs will attend 60,000 hours of practice and research annually.

It is recognized worldwide by the Association of Collegiate Business Schools and Programs,  the Public Relations Society of America, International Advertising Association and Tourism Education Quality.

Background

UADE is an institution with 50 years of activity in university education, which is developed from a purely business perspective.  It was created by the Argentine Chamber of Corporations with the aim of training professionals to adapt to the growing needs of current and future companies.

Ranking
According to the QS World University Rankings, UADE is the eighth best private university in the country and is ranked sixth in Buenos Aires, being the only one with an urban campus in that city.

Undergraduate degrees
Complete list of degree programs:

School of Architecture and Design
 BA in Architecture
 BA Audiovisual Design
 BA in Interior Design
 BA in Graphic Design
 BA in Industrial Design
 BA in Multimedia and Interaction Design
 BA in Textile and Apparel Design
 BA Design and Managenent of Aesthetic's for Fashion

School of Communication
 BA in Performing Arts
 BA in Communication Sciences
 BA in Digital and Interactive Communication
 BA in Global Communication
 BA in Gastronomy
 BA in Media and Entertainment Management
 BA in Advertising
 BA in Public and Institutional Relations
 BA in Tourism and Hotel Management
 BA in Sports management

School of Economics
 BA in Accountancy
 BA in Business management
 BA in Marketing
 BA in International trade
 BA in Global business management
 BA in Global finance management
 BA in Economics
 BA in Finance
 BA in Human resources
BA in Digital business

School of Engineering and Science
BA in Environmental management
BA in Information technology management
 BA in Bioinformatics
 BA in Biotechnology
 Electronic engineering
 BA in Computer engineering
 BA in Electromechanic engineering
 BA in Food engineering
 BA in Food industrial technology
 BA in Video game development
 BA in Industrial engineering
 Ba in Agricultural production and management

School of Law and Social Sciences

 BA in Law
 BA in Government and international relations
 BA in Politics and public administration
 BA in Public translation in English language

School of Health Sciences
 BA in Health services management
BA in Nutrition
 BA in Psychology

Postgraduate degrees
Complete list of degree programs:

 PhD in Economics
 Master of Business Administration
 Master in Institutional communications management
 Master of Finance and control management
 Master of Human resources management 
 Master in Strategic information management
 Master of Business management
 Master of Business law
 Master of Applied economics
 Master of Information technology and communications

UADE Business School
UADE business school offers management and business training programs aimed at developing technical, managerial and leadership skills. It aim to generate a high impact on the organization and enhance the professional growth of the participants.

UADE Business School is among the best business schools in the country.

Sports
UADE students can participate in a wide variety of extracurricular proposals designed to complement the study, meet students from other careers and exchange experiences.

At the university gym, students have the possibility of receiving personalized attention from a specialized team of high-performance professors and graduates.

The university offers an important space for sports. Within the campus, there is a microstadium with capacity for 1,200 people. It includes a basketball court with international regulatory measures, a volleyball court, while the rebuttable stands leave room for the practice of handball and football.

Subdivisions

UADE Labs
UADE Labs is the first comprehensive technological building in Argentina, equipped with state-of-the-art laboratories prepared for teaching and research in biosciences, hard sciences, design subjects, and the rest of UADE's disciplines. Its 29 laboratories allow a comprehensive academic experience.

It has 9,000 square meters, distributed in 11 upper floors and three basements.

UADE Art
UADE Art is a Contemporary Art Center that contributes to a comprehensive academic training within the heart of the university.  It is a space for reflection open to the entire community, made up of three exhibition rooms and an open-air amphitheater.

UADE HUB
UADE HUB is the area that promotes entrepreneurship and innovation. There is an Entrepreneurs Club that has more than 3,200 members made up of students and graduates who have an idea, a project or an ongoing venture. It is accompanied in this process with support, linking, training, technical assistance in specific needs, networking, motivation and three coworking spaces for students.

Investigation
At UADE, research activities are articulated and managed through the Research Coordination, a unit that depends on the Academic Secretary of the university.

Research activities are developed within the framework of 3 Institutes, the Institute of Economics, the Institute of Social Sciences and Project Disciplines and the Institute of Technology.

References

External links 

 Official website 
 

UADE
Universities in Buenos Aires Province
Educational institutions established in 1957
1957 establishments in Argentina